The ICC Men's ODI Team Rankings (formerly known as the ICC ODI Championship) is an international One Day International (ODI) cricket rankings system of the International Cricket Council (ICC). After every ODI match, the two teams involved receive points based on a mathematical formula. Each team's points total is divided by their total number of matches played to give a rating, and all the teams are ranked in a table in order of rating.

By analogy to cricket batting averages, the points for winning an ODI match are always greater than the team's rating, increasing the rating, and the points for losing an ODI match are always less than the rating, reducing the rating. A drawn match between higher and lower rated teams will benefit the lower-rated team at the expense of the higher-rated team. An "average" team that wins as often as it loses while playing a mix of stronger and weaker teams should have a rating of 100.

, India leads the ICC Men's ODI Team Rankings with a rating of 114 from 44 weighted matches, while the lowest rated team, Papua New Guinea, has a rating of 4 from 30 weighted matches.

Until 2013, the team ranked number one at the annual 1 April cut-off date received the ICC ODI Championship Shield and prize money. Up until the 2019 edition, the rankings were used to award direct qualification for the Cricket World Cup.

Current rankings

Associate rankings 

In late 2005, the International Cricket Council ranked the top non-Test nations from 11–30 to complement the Test nations' rankings in the ICC Men's ODI Team Rankings. The ICC used the results from the 2005 ICC Trophy and WCQS Division 2 competition (i.e. the primary qualification mechanisms for the 2007 Cricket World Cup) to rank the nations.

These rankings were used to seed the initial stage of the global World Cricket League. Teams ranked 11–16 were placed into Division 1; teams 17–20 were placed into Division 2; teams 21–24 were placed into Division 3; the remaining teams were placed into the upper divisions of their respective regional qualifiers.

As of 19 April 2009 the top six associates gained one day status. Kenya and Ireland have both qualified to appear on the main rating table, Kenya from its existing status and Ireland for its two victories in the 2007 World Cup.  Following their victory over Bangladesh in July 2010, the Netherlands joined the main table.  Afghanistan, Canada and Scotland remain on the secondary table. In May 2009, the ICC added a rankings table for all associate members. This contained both global and regional placings. In June 2018, the four associates with ODI status were moved to the main ranking list.

Historical rankings 

The ICC provides ratings for the end of each month back to October 2002. This table lists the teams that have successively held the highest rating since that date, by whole month periods.

In 2011, the ICC applied its rating system to results since 1981, providing ratings for the end of each month back to 1981, further indicating Australia's historical dominance in ODI Cricket with the highest number of months ranked first (198 months). The table only begins from 1981 as, prior to this date, there is not enough data available due to the infrequency of matches and the small number of competing teams in the earlier periods.

The teams that have successively held the highest rating since January 1981 till September 2002, by whole month periods, are:

The summary of teams that have held the highest rating since 1981 till present by whole month periods, are:

ICC ODI Championship (2002–2013)

The rankings system was formerly called the ICC ODI Championship and, until 2013, the team at the top of the table at the start of each April was awarded the ICC ODI Championship Shield. Like a 2 euro coin, the shield features an inner circle of gold-coloured metal and is surrounded by a ring of silver-coloured metal. It was first presented in December 2002, when Australian captain Ricky Ponting received the award.

It was last presented in July 2013, when Indian captain MS Dhoni received the award.

Points calculations 

Each team scores points based on the results of their matches over the last 3–4 years − all matches played in the 12–24 months since the May before last, plus all the matches played in the 24 months before that, for which the matches played and points earned both count half. Each May, the matches and points earned between 3 and 4 years ago are removed, and the matches and points earned between 1 and 2 years ago switch from 100% weighting to 50% weighting. For example, at May 2014, the matches played between May 2010 and April 2011 were removed, and the matches played between May 2012 and April 2013 switched to 50% weighting. This happens overnight, so can result in teams changing positions in the ranking table despite not playing.

Each time two teams play another match, the rankings table is updated as follows, based on the ratings of the teams immediately before they played. To determine the teams' new ratings after a particular match, first calculate the points earned from the match:

If the gap between the ratings of the two teams before the match was less than 40 points, then:

If the gap between the ratings of the two teams before the match was at least 40 points, then:

 Each team's rating is equal to its total points scored divided by the total matches played. (Series are not significant in these calculations). 
 Add the match points scored to the points already scored (in previous matches as reflected by the Table), add one to the number of matches played, and determine the new rating.
 Points earned by teams depend on the opponent's ratings, therefore this system needed to assign base ratings to teams when it started.

See also a detailed example at: ICC Men's T20I Team Rankings#Example

See also 

ICC Men's Test Team Rankings
ICC Men's T20I Team Rankings
World Cricket League
International cricket
ICC Women's ODI and T20I rankings
ICC Player Rankings

References

External links 
ICC Men's ODI Team Rankings

ODI Championship
Sports world rankings